Hilary Duff: This Is Now is a two-part MTV reality television series about singer Hilary Duff, broadcast in April 2007 (see 2007 in music). It followed Duff during a promotional tour for her album Dignity in Spain, and her first performance of her single "With Love" in Europe. It showed Duff participating in photo shoots, her personal affairs, and interview segments. The first episode aired on April 3, and the second on April 9, 2007.

The show took sixty weeks to film, and an MTV crew followed Duff around, filming her preparations for the release of the Dignity album.

References

External links

2007 American television series debuts
2007 American television series endings
2000s American reality television series
English-language television shows
Hilary Duff
MTV original programming